The 2010–11 season was the ninth in the history of AFC Wimbledon, their third season in the Football Conference and their second season in Conference National.  The club went on to win promotion to the Football League in the historic play-off final against Luton Town on 21 May 2011.

League table

Results summary

Match results

Pre-season friendlies

Conference National

August

September

October

November

December

January

February

March

April

Conference National play-offs

Semi-final

Final

FA Cup

FA Trophy

References

AFC Wimbledon seasons
AFC Wimbledon